Quilamba (or Kilamba) is an Angolan neighborhood that serves as the administrative center of Belas Municipality and a large housing development site 30 km (18 miles) from Luanda, the capital city of Angola. It is being built by the China International Trust and Investment Corporation.

Quilamba covers an area of 30.5 square kilometers and will eventually offer  homes for more than 200,000 inhabitants. It comprises about 750 apartment blocks ranging from 5 to 13 floors, over 100 commercial premises, 17 schools and 24 daycare centers to provide care and education for children, as well as over 240 stores to drive the local economy. The cost is reported at US$3.5 billion, financed by a Chinese credit line and repaid by the Angolan government with oil.

, the buildings were largely complete but still unoccupied. Only 220 apartments had been sold out of the first release of 2,800. Sales were slow due to affordability and difficulty in obtaining mortgage loans. One school was in operation, but children were travelling in by bus from other areas as there was no one living nearby. The government planned to use some of the residential blocks as social housing.

Although Quilamba contributes to meeting the election pledge made by President Jose Eduardo dos Santos in 2008 to build a million new homes in four years.

However, despite the slow start, new legislation signed into law by dos Santos resulted in a massive boom in demand.
Prices of the smallest units were reduced from US $125,000 to $70,000.
The population increased to 40,000 residents in September 2013,
to 80,000 in July 2015. In 2019, the estimated population was 129,000 inhabitants.

References

External links

Slideshow at Business Insider

Buildings and structures in Luanda
Buildings and structures under construction in Angola